Kimberly Ann Linehan (born December 11, 1962) is an American former competition swimmer, world champion, and former world record-holder.

At the 1978 World Aquatics Championships in Berlin, Germany, Linehan won bronze medals with third-place finishes in the 400-meter and 800-meter freestyle events.  Linehan won a gold medal by placing first in the 800-meter freestyle at the 1982 World Aquatics Championships in Guayaquil, Ecuador.  At the 1984 Summer Olympics in Los Angeles, California, she finished fourth in the women's 400-meter freestyle.  She set the 400-meter freestyle world record (long course) in 1978, and held the 1,500-meter freestyle world record (long course) from 1979 to 1987.

She was inducted into the International Swimming Hall of Fame as an "Honor Swimmer" in 1997, and the University of Texas Women's Athletics Hall of Honor in 2008.

See also
 List of members of the International Swimming Hall of Fame
 List of University of Texas at Austin alumni
 List of World Aquatics Championships medalists in swimming (women)
 World record progression 400 metres freestyle
 World record progression 1500 metres freestyle

References

External links
 
 

1962 births
Living people
American female freestyle swimmers
World record setters in swimming
Olympic swimmers of the United States
People from Bronxville, New York
Swimmers at the 1979 Pan American Games
Swimmers at the 1984 Summer Olympics
Texas Longhorns women's swimmers
World Aquatics Championships medalists in swimming
Pan American Games gold medalists for the United States
Pan American Games silver medalists for the United States
Pan American Games medalists in swimming
Universiade medalists in swimming
Universiade gold medalists for the United States
Medalists at the 1981 Summer Universiade
Medalists at the 1979 Pan American Games